Express Football Club, abbreviated as Express, is a Ugandan football club from Kampala, the largest city and capital of Uganda. The club play their home games at the Muteesa II Wankulukuku Stadium.

History
Express FC is popularly referred to by the club fans as the Red Eagles and has also been known as the Express Sports Club. The club is one of the oldest football clubs in Uganda, having been founded in October 1957 by managers of the Uganda Express Newspapers.  The main architect of the club's foundation was Jolly Joe Kiwanuka, the owner of the newspaper, who was ably supported by Paul Ssengendo, Hannington Kiwanuka, Dr. Banabas Kiwanuka, Gaster Nsubuga and Bishop Dr. Dunstan Nsubuga.

The Red Eagles were among the first Ugandan clubs to use football boots and since the club was revived in 1979 they have ever been relegated from the top tier league. They are the only Super League side that has never featured in the promotional mini leagues. Hassan Mubiru finished the club and league's top scorer for three consecutive seasons from 2001 to 2003.

In total Express FC has won six league championships and ten Uganda Cup titles with the 'double' (league & cup winners) being achieved in 1995.

League history
Express joined the Kampala and District Football League (KDFL) and by 1964 had become a leading force in the competition by winning Division One championship, with the club's leading scorer Ali Kitonsa netting 54 goals in 18 appearances. In 1968–69 the club participated in the inaugural season of the National League First Division, finishing in fourth position.

The Red Eagles won their first Uganda National League championship title in 1974 and repeated the feat the following season in 1975. In the 1977 season Express defeated the Army side Simba FC 2–0 in a crucial league match and were subsequently banned for allegedly being involving in anti-government activities, by the Governor of the Central Province, Col. Abdallah Nasur, who was unhappy about his side's loss.  In 1979 the ban was lifted after the regime of Idi Amin had ended and Express returned to the National League for the 1980 season.

The Red Eagles brief interlude from National League football had lasting consequences as it gave rise to the development of its youth side Nakivubo Boys. All officials of Express turned to Nakivubo Boys and engineered their new team to become a footballing force in Uganda. Nakivubo Boys changed its name to Nakivubo Villa and then later changed its name to Sports Club Villa.

It was not until the 1993 season that Express won the Super League championship and there followed the most successful period in the club's history with further league titles in 1995 and 1996.  Then a match fixing scandal involving Express' arch rival Villa interrupted this successful period. The scandal climaxed in 2002–03 season. and at the end of this season seriously tainting Ugandan football with Villa scoring 22 goals past Akol FC and then going on to take league title on goal difference from Express.

Over the last ten years the club's league performance has diminished although in 2011–12 the Red Eagles secured the Super League championship title once more by finishing one point above Bunamwaya SC. The following season in 2012–13 the club finished in 11th place, their lowest top tier position. In 2018 a fundraising campaign was held in order to help save the team from relegation. Express barely survived relegation in the 2017-18 season, ensuring their spot only after defeating bottom club Masavu 1-0 in the final game of the season. Their 13th place finish became their lowest finish in the top flight.

Cups
In contrast to their league performances, Express have been the most successful club in the Ugandan Cup winning the competition on 10 occasions in 1985, 1991, 1992, 1994, 1995, 1997, 2001, 2002–03, 2006 and 2006–07. They have also made numerous appearances in African cup competitions, including one appearance in the CAF Champions League, six appearances in the African Cup of Champions Clubs, two appearances in the CAF Confederation Cup, two appearances in the CAF Cup and five appearances in the CAF Cup Winners' Cup.  In 1995 the Red Eagles reached the semi-finals of the African Cup of Champions Clubs before going out 2–1 on aggregate to South African club, Orlando Pirates, the eventual champions. In addition the club has twice finished runners-up in the CECAFA Clubs Cup, the regional club competition covering East and Central Africa, in 1994 and 1995. Another success was winning the East African Hedex Super Cup in 2001–02.

Record in the top tier

African cups history

Achievements
Ugandan Premier League: 7
 1974, 1975, 1993, 1995, 1996, 2011–12, 2020-2021

Ugandan Cup: 10
 1985, 1991, 1992, 1994, 1995, 1997, 2001, 2002–03, 2006, 2006–07.

 East African Hedex Super Cup: 1
 2001–02.

Performance in CAF competitions
CAF Champions League: 1 appearance
1997 – First Round

 African Cup of Champions Clubs: 6 appearances

1975 – Second Round
1976 – Second Round
1989 – Second Round

1990 – First Round
1994 – disqualified in First Round
1995 – Semi-Finals

1996 – Preliminary Round

CAF Confederation Cup: 2 appearances

2004 – First Round

2008 – First Round

CAF Cup: 2 appearances

1999 – Second Round

2003 – First Round

African Cup Winners' Cup: 5 appearances

1986 – First Round
1992 – First Round

1993 – First Round
1998 – Second Round

2002 – First Round

Managerial history

Since the formation of the club a total of 44 men have been appointed as head coach of Express.  The coaches that have served Express are detailed below:

 Jolly 'Joe' Kiwanuka (1959–73)
 Robert Kiberu (1974–77)
 Ashe Mukasa (1979)
 John Dibya (1980)
 Emmanuel Nsubuga (1980–82)
 Henry Buyego (1983)
 George Mukasa (1984–85)
 Charles Masembe (1985–86)
 Dan Lutalo (1986)
 George Mukasa (1986)
 Robert Kiberu (1987–90)
 Billy Kizito (1990)
 David Otti (1990–95)
 Jimmy Muguwa (1995–96)
 Dragan Popadić (1996–97)
 Jimmy Muguwa (1997–98)
 Abo Korouma (1998–99)
 Godfrey Nyola (1999)
 Rashid Shedu (1999–00)
 Godfrey Nyola (2000)
 Eddie May (2000–01)
 Asumani Lubowa (2001)
 Godfrey Nyola (2001)
 Jimmy Muguwa (2002)
 Abdul Kadir (2002)
 Leo Adraa (2002–03)
 Jan Fray (2003)
 James S'ianga (2004)
 Leo Adraa (2004–05)
 Godfrey Nyola (2005)
 Polly Ouma (2005)
 George Ssimwogerere (2006)
 Kefa Kisala (2006)
 George Ssimwogerere (2006)
 Kefa Kisala (2006–07)
 Ibrahim Buwembo (2007)
 Kennedy Lubogo (2007)
 Sam Ssimbwa (2007)
 Polly Ouma (2007)
 Jimmy Muguwa (2007–08)
 David Otti (2008–11)
 Sam Ssimbwa (2010–12)
 Moses Basena (2012–13)
 Frank Anyau (2013)
 Sam Ssimbwa (2013)
 Wassawa Bossa (2014 – 14th February 2022)
 James Odoch  (August 2022)

See also 

 Muteesa II Wankulukuku Stadium
Ugandan Premier League

References

External links
 Uganda – List of Champions – RSSSF (Hans Schöggl)
 Uganda – List of Cup Finals – RSSSF (Mikael Jönsson, Ian King and Hans Schöggl)
 Ugandan Football League Tables – League321.com
 Express Football Club Website (Internet Archive)

Football clubs in Uganda
Association football clubs established in 1957
Sport in Kampala
1957 establishments in Uganda